Wright-Dalton-Bell-Anchor Department Store Building, also known as the Dalton Store and F.W. Woolworth Store, is a historic commercial building located at Poplar Bluff, Butler County, Missouri.  It was built in 1927–1928, and is a two-to three-story, rectangular brick building with terracotta embellishments.  It features shaped parapets with terracotta coping and quatrefoil insets and a decorative terracotta signboard and storefront surround. An F.W. Woolworth store occupied the building from 1947 to about 1987.

It was added to the National Register of Historic Places in 2006.

References

F. W. Woolworth Company buildings and structures
Commercial buildings on the National Register of Historic Places in Missouri
Commercial buildings completed in 1928
Buildings and structures in Butler County, Missouri
National Register of Historic Places in Butler County, Missouri